The East Fifth Street Historic District, located in East Liverpool, Ohio, was added to the National Register of Historic Places in November 1985. The district encompasses three blocks of downtown East Liverpool along East Fifth street between Market Street and Broadway.

The district is significant because of its central position in the growing commerce of East Liverpool during the 19th and early 20th centuries as well as for its examples of Classic Revival architecture.

References

Neoclassical architecture in Ohio
Historic districts in Columbiana County, Ohio
National Register of Historic Places in Columbiana County, Ohio
East Liverpool, Ohio
Historic districts on the National Register of Historic Places in Ohio